Nigel Brian Windsor Widlake (13 April 1931 – 2 January 2017) was a British journalist, broadcaster and presenter.

Early life
Widlake was born in Fiji on 13 April 1931.

Education
Widlake was educated at two independent schools for boys, at the time based in Hammersmith in West London: first at Colet Court School, now known as St Paul's Juniors, when, shortly after enrolment, he and others were evacuated to the village of Much Hadham in Hertfordshire in the early part of the Second World War, and then at St Paul's School, followed by Clare College, Cambridge.

Life and career
Widlake served initially as a cadet before his promotion to 2nd Lieutenant in the Royal Hampshire Regiment on 4 November 1950.

Widlake worked as a reporter for ITN in the 1960s, and was a regular presenter of BBC Radio 4's news magazine programmes The World at One and PM during the 1970s and 1980s. Widlake joined London's news and talk radio station LBC to present a breakfast programme on LBC Crown FM, later LBC NewsTalk 97.3 in 1989. He then transferred to LBC's hour-long Midday News programme.

Widlake conducted Nelson Mandela's first ever televised interview in 1961. At the time, Mandela was on the run from the South African police. He also became well known for co-presenting The Money Programme on BBC 2 in the early 1980s with Valerie Singleton.

Widlake died, following a short illness, at home in Wiltshire on 2 January 2017, at the age of 85.

Personal life
Widlake became the stepfather of the sports journalist, TV presenter and former cricketer Mark Nicholas, following his marriage to the actress Anne Nicholas in 1989.

Widlake died on 2 January 2017 in Wiltshire.

References

1931 births
2017 deaths
Alumni of Clare College, Cambridge
BBC newsreaders and journalists
BBC Radio 4 presenters
British television journalists
ITN newsreaders and journalists
People educated at St Paul's School, London
Royal Hampshire Regiment officers